ISQ.networks Press Agency is a German multinational press agency company headquartered in Düsseldorf Germany. Its core businesses are delivering news and producing reports, magazines, shows and complete programs parts for cable stations or TV stations in one of its owned 120 studios world-wide. As of 2014, it has overtaken the North American Press Agency with all 4,000 employees.

References

External links

 
 Former site of North American Press Agency

Companies based in Düsseldorf
German brands
Mass media companies established in 2001
Multinational companies headquartered in Germany
German journalism organisations